The École nationale supérieure Louis-Lumière (ENS Louis-Lumière) offers theoretical, practical as well as technical and artistic education and training for those wishing to go into the various branches of the audiovisual industry in France.

Run under the auspices of the Ministry of Higher Education, it offers a state-funded course at postgraduate level leading to a nationally recognised diploma equivalent to a Master's degree.

History
The second film school in history, it was founded in 1926 as l'Ecole Technique de Cinématographie et de Photographie on the rue de Vaugirard, under the leadership of personalities such as Louis Lumière and Léon Gaumont. In 2012, the school moved to the Cité du Cinéma in Saint-Denis.

Notable alumni
Claire Atherton
Fred Zinnemann (1926)
Pierre Lhomme
Gaspar Noé
Claire Mathon
Euzhan Palcy
Michel Houellebecq (1981)
Parviz Kimiavi
Taïeb Louhichi
Youssef Ishaghpour
Philippe Rousselot
Eduardo Serra
Bob Swaim
Jaco Van Dormael
Trần Anh Hùng
Jean-Jacques Annaud
Claude Zidi
Benoît Delhomme
Sophie Delaporte

References

Auguste and Louis Lumière
Educational institutions established in 1926
Film schools in France
1926 establishments in France
Saint-Denis, Seine-Saint-Denis